Pennyrile Forest State Resort Park is a park located near Dawson Springs, Kentucky in Christian County, Kentucky. The park encompasses  and takes its name from a colloquial form of the word pennyroyal, a small flowering plant native to the area. Park features include a 24-room lodge with restaurant, 12 cottages, campground, multi-purpose trails, 18-hole golf course, and  lake with non-motorized boat rentals. The park was sited around an existing lake, behind a dam originally built in 1938.

References

External links
Pennyrile Forest State Resort Park Kentucky Department of Parks

Protected areas of Hopkins County, Kentucky
State parks of Kentucky